Tetiana Valeriïvna Kozachenko  (born 18 December 1981) is a former Ukrainian freestyle skier. Kozachenko finished 4th in Aerial skiing at the 1998 Winter Olympics.

References

External links

Ukrainian female freestyle skiers
Freestyle skiers at the 1998 Winter Olympics
Freestyle skiers at the 2002 Winter Olympics
Freestyle skiers at the 2006 Winter Olympics
1981 births
Living people
Olympic freestyle skiers of Ukraine